"After the Love Slips Away" is a song written and recorded by American country music artist Earl Thomas Conley.  It was released in February 1982 as the fourth single from the album Fire & Smoke.  The song reached number 16 on the Billboard Hot Country Singles & Tracks chart.

Chart performance

References

1982 singles
1981 songs
Earl Thomas Conley songs
Songs written by Earl Thomas Conley
RCA Records singles